Farmland Downtown Historic District is a national historic district located at Farmland, Randolph County, Indiana.

The district encompasses 26 contributing buildings in the central business district of Farmland.  The district developed between about 1880 and 1944 and includes notable examples of Italianate, Renaissance Revival, Romanesque Revival, Commercial style, and Bungalow / American Craftsman style architecture.

Notable buildings include the I.O.O.F. building (1898), Retter Hotel (c. 1860, 1920), Goodrich Brothers grain elevator (1919), Clayton Block (1899), McCormick and Yount Hardware Store (c. 1880), Knights of Pythias Building (1908), Farmland City Building (1923), The Opera House (c. 1885), and J.W. Clayton Building (1898, c. 1920).

It was added to the National Register of Historic Places in 1994.

References

Historic districts on the National Register of Historic Places in Indiana
Renaissance Revival architecture in Indiana
Romanesque Revival architecture in Indiana
Italianate architecture in Indiana
Bungalow architecture in Indiana
Historic districts in Randolph County, Indiana
National Register of Historic Places in Randolph County, Indiana